The Presidential Palace ( Proedrikó Mégaro ) is the official residence and principal workplace of the President of the Republic of Cyprus. It is located close to the centre of Nicosia, the capital city of Cyprus, and is surrounded by a thick pine woodland.

History

The original building was a prefabricated structure erected in November 1878 on a site known as Snake Hill, on which Richard the Lionheart is said to have set up camp. The building was shipped by the war office from London to Ceylon, its original destination; but by the time it reached Port Said, it was no longer required there, and was diverted to Cyprus. The building arrived in Larnaca and was transported to Nicosia in boxes on the backs of camels.

The building was burned down during the pro-Enosis riots of 21 October 1931. As a result of the disturbances, a special law was enacted by Sir Ronald Storrs, the Governor of Cyprus, on 21 December 1931, whereby the Greek Cypriot inhabitants had to pay for the building of a new Government House.  A total of £34,315 was demanded, payable by 30 June 1932.  The amounts required from various towns included £14,000 from Nicosia, £5,500 from Limassol, £5000 from Famagusta, £2000 from Larnaca, £500 from Paphos, and £6315 from villages.

The new building was designed by Maurice Webb of the firm of Sir Aston Webb & Sons, Westminster, London. Construction was undertaken by J V Hamilton & L F Weldon of the Public Works Department, Nicosia. The main structure was built of Yerolakkos sandstone, with harder sandstone from Limassol used for the staircases. Construction was completed in 1937, at a total cost of £70,000.  Among the Palace's most prominent features are the British coat-of-arms, and four gargoyles with human heads depicting the British general foreman in charge of construction, the head mason, the head carpenter, and an unknown labourer. The building was originally named Government House; in 1960, it was renamed the Presidential Palace.

The structure was gutted by fire during the coup d'état by the Cypriot National Guard and EOKA-B on 15 July 1974, and was rebuilt by the Public Works Department and Philippou Brothers in 1977. The rebuilding costs were paid by the Greek Government.

On 28 May 2010, it was announced that the building was to have a €1.2 million upgrade to reduce its carbon emissions. The project included solar panels in the car park, a new ventilation system, and replacement of windows. A further €2.7 million was spent to build a new hall for Cyprus's 2012 European Union Presidency. The new hall opened on 17 May 2012; it can seat 500 people, or 300 if seated by table.

See also

Government Houses of the British Empire and Commonwealth

References

External links

Presidency of the Republic of Cyprus,The Presidential Palace

Cyprus and the Commonwealth of Nations
Official residences in Cyprus
Presidential residences
Buildings and structures in Nicosia
Government Houses of the British Empire and Commonwealth